"What's Come Over You" is a song recorded by Canadian country music artist Paul Brandt. It was released in 1997 as the second single from his second studio album, Outside the Frame. It peaked at number 10 on the RPM Country Tracks chart in March 1998.

Chart performance

References

1997 singles
Paul Brandt songs
Reprise Records singles
Song recordings produced by Josh Leo
1997 songs
Songs written by Gene Nelson (songwriter)